Peter Barclay (born 22 July 1965) is a South African cricketer. He played in sixteen first-class matches for Eastern Province from 1985/86 to 1995/96.

See also
 List of Eastern Province representative cricketers

References

External links
 

1965 births
Living people
South African cricketers
Eastern Province cricketers
Cricketers from Port Elizabeth